Ernest Morris (1913–1987) was an English film director.

Selected filmography
 Three Crooked Men (1958)
 Night Train for Inverness (1960)
 The Court Martial of Major Keller (1961)
 Three Spare Wives (1962)
 What Every Woman Wants (1962)
 The Spanish Sword (1962)
 Richard the Lionheart (TV series) (1962-1963)
 The Sicilians (1963)
 Shadow of Fear (1963)
 The Return of Mr. Moto (1965)

References

External links

 Earnest Morris (All Movie Com)
 Earnest Morris Photos (IMDb)

1913 births
1987 deaths
Film directors from London